Syava is an urban locality (an urban-type settlement), in Nizhny Novgorod Oblast, Russia.

Population
Population:

References

Urban-type settlements in Nizhny Novgorod Oblast
Shakhunya Urban Okrug